Jacqueline Nava Mouett (born April 11, 1980) is a Mexican professional boxer. She is a former world champion in two weight classes, having held the WBA female bantamweight title in 2005; the WBC female super bantamweight title twice between 2005 and 2015; and the WBA super bantamweight title twice between 2012 and 2015. As of September 2020, she is ranked as the world's second best active female super bantamweight by The Ring and BoxRec.

In 2015, voters in the eighth federal electoral district of Baja California elected Nava to the Chamber of Deputies for the LXIII Legislature of the Mexican Congress.

Professional boxing career
In April 2004, she won the Mexican National super bantamweight title by knocking out Ofelia Dominguez.

WBA bantamweight champion
She won her first world championship, the WBA female bantamweight title by beating Martha Leticia Arevalo in Tijuana, Baja California, Mexico.

WBC super bantamweight champion
On May 5, 2005 she moved up in weight to capture her second world title, defeating Leona Brown to win the inaugural WBC female super bantamweight title.

Interim title
In 2007 she beat Donna Biggers and won the WBC interim female super bantamweight title. She defeated Maria Andrea Miranda to retain her title.

Legislative career
In June 2015, voters elected Nava, running as the candidate of the PAN, to the Chamber of Deputies in the LXIII Legislature of the Mexican Congress. She serves on the Sports, Children's Rights, and Youth Committees.

Personal
Nava has a daughter, Frida Mendoza Nava.

See also
List of WBC Female World Champions

References

External links

Boxers from Baja California
Sportspeople from Tijuana
World boxing champions
World Boxing Council champions
World super-bantamweight boxing champions
Mexican women boxers
Super-bantamweight boxers
1980 births
Living people
Members of the Chamber of Deputies (Mexico) for Baja California
21st-century Mexican politicians
21st-century Mexican women politicians
Politicians from Tijuana
Women members of the Chamber of Deputies (Mexico)
Deputies of the LXIII Legislature of Mexico
Tijuana Institute of Technology alumni